The United States Ambassador to Ireland is the ambassador extraordinary and plenipotentiary from the United States of America to Ireland. It is considered a highly prestigious position within the United States Foreign Service. The current ambassador is Claire Cronin.

The chief of mission for the United States in Ireland held the title of envoy extraordinary and minister plenipotentiary from 1927 through 1950, and six people served in the role. Since 1950, the title has been ambassador, and 23 people have served in the role. Only the first envoy, Frederick A. Sterling, was a career Foreign Service Officer – other envoys, and all ambassadors to date, have been non-career appointees. The first four envoys were commissioned to the Irish Free State, prior to the formation of the State.

The ambassador and embassy staff at large work at the Ballsbridge Chancery of the Embassy of the United States, Dublin. Deerfield Residence is the official residence of the ambassador, located in the Phoenix Park, Dublin.

Incumbent
The position was vacant from January 2017 through the end of June 2019, with Reece Smyth serving as the chargé d'affaires of the U.S. Embassy in Ireland. The prior ambassador, Kevin O'Malley, was nominated by President Barack Obama and served from October 2014 until the presidential inauguration of Donald Trump. In December 2016, it was reported that then president-elect Trump intended to name Brian P. Burns as the next ambassador to Ireland. However, in June 2017, Burns withdrew his name from consideration, due to ill health.

Edward F. Crawford, a businessman and entrepreneur from Ohio whose parents were from Cork, was approved to be the next ambassador by the Senate's foreign relations committee in May 2019, confirmed by a vote of the United States Senate on June 13, 2019, and sworn into office on June 26, 2019. He officially began his term as ambassador upon presentation of his credentials to President of Ireland Michael D. Higgins on July 1, 2019.

Chiefs of Mission

Envoys
Until 1950, the official title was Envoy Extraordinary and Minister Plenipotentiary.

 Commissioned to the Irish Free State
 Died in office (while in Ireland)
 Promoted to Ambassador

Ambassadors
Since 1950, the official title has been Ambassador Extraordinary and Plenipotentiary.

 Died in office (while in the United States)
 Interred in Ireland
 Still living

Other nominees

Appointed or nominated, but did not serve.
W. W. McDowell
Appointment: September 13, 1933. Commissioned during a recess of the Senate; did not serve under this appointment. Reappointed in January 1934.
William E. McCann
Note: Not commissioned; nomination of March 17, 1981, not acted upon by the Senate.

Chargé d’affaires
Interim chiefs of mission.
 Stuart A. Dwyer
September 2013 – October 2014
 Reece Smyth
January 2017 – June 2019
 Alexandra McKnight
January 2021 – February 2022

See also
Embassy of the United States, Dublin
Deerfield Residence – Official residence of the ambassador
Ireland–United States relations
Foreign relations of Ireland
Ambassadors of the United States
Embassy of Ireland, Washington, D.C.

References
United States Department of State: Background notes on Ireland

External links
 United States Department of State: Chiefs of Mission for Ireland
 United States Department of State: Ireland
 United States Embassy in Ireland
 Twitter account (verified) of the United States Ambassador to Ireland

Ireland

United States
Politics of Ireland